The 5th Army Division（） formed in December 1967 by Jinan Military Region. Soon after its formation, in May 1968, the division was transferred to Urumqi, Xinjiang.

By then the division was composed of:
13th Infantry Regiment;
14th Infantry Regiment;
15th Infantry Regiment;
312th Artillery Regiment (renamed as Artillery Regiment, 5th Army Division from December 1969).

On August 20, 1980, the Central Military Commission posthumously awarded He Changfu(), assistant squad leader from 1st Squad, 6th Company,  14th Infantry Regiment the honorary title of "model of loving the people".

In December 1985, the 5th Army Division was reduced and renamed as Garrison Brigade of Lanzhou Military Region（）.

From September 1985 to October 1986, the brigade's Reconnaissance Company temporarily attached to 5th Reconnaissance Group and took part in combat reconnaissance missions in Laoshan area.

In September 1992 the brigade was further reduced to 1st Independent Infantry Regiment of Xinjiang Military District（）.

Hierarchical Superiors
Liu Zhizhong, a former deputy commander of the Eastern Xinjiang Military District.
Guo Xing, a former military commander in Northern Xinjiang Military District, who is the prototype of the famous character "Li Xiangyang" in the movie Plain Guerrilla.

External links
https://web.archive.org/web/20161228034745/http://www.360doc.com/content/15/1021/23/11766040_507436245.shtml, 建国后中国人民解放军步兵师的发展（1-100师）

Infantry divisions of the People's Liberation Army
Military units and formations established in 1968